Tamás Törtei (born 2 October 1985) is a Hungarian football player who currently plays for Tarpa FC.

References

External links
Profile at HLSZ

1985 births
Living people
People from Szolnok
Hungarian footballers
Association football defenders
Celldömölki VSE footballers
Marcali VFC footballers
Pécsi MFC players
Barcsi SC footballers
Szolnoki MÁV FC footballers
FC Tatabánya players
Nyíregyháza Spartacus FC players
Nemzeti Bajnokság I players
Sportspeople from Jász-Nagykun-Szolnok County